Sorority Girls is a show that first aired on E4 on Tuesday 8 November 2011. The show follows female students from England who compete to become members of Britain's first ever sorority, in Leeds. The show aired on Tuesdays at 9 PM. Every week one student is eliminated, leaving five final girls. The final five were Maxine Howarth as Entertainment Chair, Charlotte ('char-char') Bridgewater as Standards Chair, Camille (Mille) Whitty as Philanthropy Chair, Katie Hames as President, and Sophie Rason as Social Chair.

The girls from Leeds were welcomed by the Sorority Sisters "American Girls": Amelia Smith (President), Arianna Kjos (Philanthropy Chair), Devan Lockhert (Social Chair), Dominique Kruse (Standards Chair), Hannah Hagler (Entertainment Chair). For a Rush Day, where wannabe Sorority Girls must face a series of harsh interviews from the Sorority Sisters to determine who's suitable to be a provisional member of the sorority.

Fifty female British university students show up to the house, but only 20 will be invited to the exclusive evening party called 'Preference', where the girls have a final chance to sway the Sorority Sisters.

As the Brit girls struggle to impress with their 'hidden talents', the Sorority Sisters must reach a final decision on who will become 'Pledges' and take up the 14 places available in the house.

The 14 chosen pledges were:
 Alana Elliott
 Alex Fraser
 Camille Whitty
 Charlotte Bridgewater
 Chloe White
 Christal Barrymore 
 Christiana Bell
 Claudia Wright
 Helen White
 Katie Hames
 Maxine Howarth
 Nadia Khiavi
 Sophie Rason
 Topaz Dominique

References
https://asecondself.wordpress.com/2013/03/07/e4-sorority-girl-claudia-wright-i-changed-absolutely-nothing-about-myself-for-the-show/
http://leedsstudentmagazine.co.uk/sorority-girls/
http://www.unrealitytv.co.uk/reality-tv/why-e4s-sorority-girls-will-go-down-as-the-best-show-that-nobody-watched/
http://www.huffingtonpost.co.uk/scott-bryan/tv-hit-or-sht-sorority-gi_b_1087225.html
http://www.radiotimes.com/news/2011-11-16/sorority-girls-is-cult-viewing---quite-literally

2011 British television series debuts
2011 British television series endings
British reality television series
Channel 4 original programming
Television series by ITV Studios